George Henry William Jerram (15 August 1904 – 20 May 1948) was an Australian rules footballer who played with Geelong and North Melbourne in the Victorian Football League (VFL), and with Williamstown in the Victorian Football Association (VFA).

Football
Jerrem, a utility, was used as a half forward flanker, back pocket and in the ruck during his career.

Geelong (VFL)
An interstate player in just his second season, Jerram represented the VFL in the 1927 Melbourne Carnival. He also finished equal sixth in the Brownlow Medal that year, after a good season with Geelong.

North Melbourne (VFL)
In 1930 he switched to North Melbourne and didn't miss a game in his first two seasons. He made his last appearance with North Melbourne in 1935.

In 144 VFL games, Jerram was never reported by the umpires and off the field worked as a policeman. After leaving the police force, Jerram became a boiler attendant.

Wiliamstown (VFA)
In 1936, he transferred to Williamstown, who he captain-coached in 1938, and played in 45 games over three seasons (1936-1938). He was vice-captain in 1936 and 1937 under the captain-coaching of former North Melbourne teammate, Neville Huggins, before taking over the role the following season.

Death
He died in 1948, from a fractured skull as well as other injuries sustained when he fell on a South Melbourne footpath. Accounts of how he fell varied, with the inquest having an open finding, unable to determine whether it was accidental or as a result of an alleged brawl.

See also
 1927 Melbourne Carnival

Footnotes

References

External links
 George Jerram's playing statistics from AFL Tables.
 George Jerram, at The VFA Project.
 George Jerram, at ''Boyles Football Photos.

1904 births
1948 deaths
Australian rules footballers from Victoria (Australia)
Geelong Football Club players
North Melbourne Football Club players
Williamstown Football Club players
Williamstown Football Club coaches
Police officers from Melbourne
Deaths from falls
Accidental deaths in Victoria (Australia)